Strophurus horneri, also known commonly as the Arnhem phasmid gecko, is a species of lizard in the family Diplodactylidae. The species is endemic to Australia.

Etymology
The specific name, horneri, is in honour of Australian zoologist Paul Horner who is a Curator Emeritus of the Museum and Art Gallery of the Northern Territory.

Geographic range
S. horneri is found in Northern Territory of northern Australia.

Description
S. horneri is narrow-headed and slender-bodied. Its dorsal colouration consists of four broad yellow stripes on a brown or grayish ground colour.

Habitat
The preferred habitat of S. horneri is grassland.

References

Further reading
Laver RJ, Nielsen SV, Rosauer DF, Oliver PM (2017). "Trans-biome diversity in Australian grass-specialist lizards (Diplodactylidae: Strophurus)". Molecular Phylogenetics and Evolution 115: 62–70.
Oliver PM, Parkin T (2014). "A new phasmid gecko (Squamata: Diplodactylidae: Strophurus) from the Arnhem Plateau: more new diversity in rare vertebrates from Northern Australia". Zootaxa 3878 (1): 037–048. (Strophurus horneri, new species).

Strophurus
Reptiles described in 2014
Taxa named by Paul M. Oliver
Taxa named by Tom Parkin
Geckos of Australia